Geobalanus oblongifolius, commonly known as gopher apple, is an evergreen shrub. It grows in America within the sandhills of peninsular Florida as well as coastal Mississippi, Alabama, Louisiana, South Carolina and Georgia.

Its fruit is eaten by wildlife and is being used in cancer research. The fruit is a food source for the gopher tortoise and many other species of wildlife.

It was originally published as Licania michauxii by British botanist G.T. Prance in J. Arnold Arbor. vol. 51 on page 526 in 1970. It was re-named as Geobalanus oblongifolius by (Michx.) Small and re-published in Fl. Miami: 81 (1913). Although it is still known by its former name in some sources.

References

Other sources 
 Prance, G. T. 1972. Chrysobalanaceae. Fl. Neotrop. Monogr. 9:42-43.
 Wunderlin, R. P. 1998. Guide to the vascular plants of Florida

Chrysobalanaceae
Plants described in 1970
Flora of Florida